The Atlanta Marriott Marquis is a 47-story,  Marriott hotel in Atlanta, Georgia, United States. It is the 15th tallest skyscraper in the city. The building was designed by Atlanta architect John C. Portman Jr. with construction completed in 1985, and because of its bulging base, it is often referred to as the "Pregnant Building" or the "Coca Cola" building as it looks like a bottle of Coke from the side elevation.

One of the defining features of the Marriott Marquis is its large atrium. It was the largest in the world upon its completion in 1985, at 470 feet (143 m) high. The atrium spans the entire height of the building and consists of two vertical chambers divided by elevator shafts and bridges. The record was later broken by the Burj Al Arab in Dubai.

The hotel would undergo its first renovation in 2007, costing $138 million to do so and lasting for three years between 2005 and 2008. This included a Starbucks Coffee, new restaurants, a new pool, new meeting rooms, a new spa, refurbished guest rooms and other updates. Then in 2015, it was once again remodeled with a cost of $78 million and featuring updates such as new guest rooms, Stay Well rooms, a concierge lounge and more.

The 42nd floor features a concierge lounge that is only open to guests staying on the 42nd through the 47th floors.

In the films The Hunger Games: Catching Fire and The Hunger Games: Mockingjay – Part 1, some scenes of the Capitol's tribute center were filmed here. Some scenes of the 2012 movie Flight were shot in the hotel as well. The atrium is also seen briefly in the 1986 movie Manhunter. It was also used as the Time Variance Authority headquarters in the Disney+ series Loki.

Gallery

See also
 List of tallest buildings in Atlanta
Hotels in Atlanta

References

1985 establishments in Georgia (U.S. state)
Hotel buildings completed in 1985
Hotels established in 1985
John C. Portman Jr. buildings
Marriott hotels
Skyscraper hotels in Atlanta
Brutalist architecture in Georgia (U.S. state)